Juan Francisco José de Urruela Morales (29 January 1881 - 16 December 1947) was an Guatemalan of Spanish descent footballer who played as a goalkeeper for FC Barcelona at the turn of the century. He is best known for being the very first goalkeeper to wear the FC Barcelona shirt when he played as such in the club's first-ever game on 8 December 1899.

Biography
Born in Guatemala City on 29 January 1881, Juan de Urruela was the eldest brother and fourth of five children. During his youth he settled in Barcelona where he married on 25 June 1907, Àgueda Sanllehy Girona, daughter of the Marquises of Caldes de Montbui.

On 8 December 1899, Urruela went down in history for being the first goalkeeper of FC Barcelona in the club's first match of its history, played at the Velódromo de la Bonanova against the city's English colony known as Team Anglès. The Guatemalan was thus the first Central American to play for Barcelona. The English won 1–0, courtesy of a goal from Arthur Witty. Despite the defeat, the local newspaper La Vanguardia highlighted Urruela's good performance in the following day, in a chronicle written by Alberto Serra.

Juan de Urruela played three more matches: on the 1899 Christmas Eve against Català FC (3–1), on 26 December against Team Anglès (2–1) and on 6 January 1900 again against the English colony (0–4), forming part of a combined team with players from Barcelona and Català in the latter two matches.

Despite some encouraging first steps with the club, he never played for Barça again. Once he left football, he practiced tennis and polo at the Real Club de Polo de Barcelona. He was president of the Catalan Tennis Federation.

Being an aristocrat of Spanish descent, King Alfonso XIII granted him Spanish nationality in December 1909, together with his younger brother, and in 1916 he restored the Marquesado de San Román de Ayala, a noble title that had been held by his ancestors.

References

1881 births
1947 deaths
Spanish footballers
FC Barcelona players
Association football goalkeepers
People from Guatemala City
Real Club de Polo de Barcelona
Catalan nobility